The 2007 Asia-Pacific Rally Championship season (APRC) was an international rally championship organized by the FIA. The champion was Australian driver Cody Crocker.

Calendar

Points

References

External links
Official website
Results on FIA website

Asia-Pacific Rally Championship seasons
Asia-Pacific Rally
Rally
Rally